Magnolia Beach is an unincorporated community and census-designated place (CDP) in Calhoun County, Texas, United States. It was first listed as a CDP in the 2020 census with a population of 217. It is located along the waterfront of Lavaca Bay, southeast of Alamo Beach. The community is part of the Victoria, Texas Metropolitan Statistical Area.

The settlement's history dates back to the late 19th century. The word Magnolia was added to the beach name to suggest the beauty of the setting since magnolias grow locally. Today, Magnolia Beach is a lightly populated, but developing bay front community.

Public education in the community of Magnolia Beach is provided by the Calhoun County Independent School District (CCISD).

References

External links

Unincorporated communities in Calhoun County, Texas
Unincorporated communities in Texas
Victoria, Texas metropolitan area
Census-designated places in Calhoun County, Texas
Census-designated places in Texas